Pierrefitte-sur-Aire (literally "Pierrefitte on Aire") is a commune in the Meuse department in Grand Est in north-eastern France.

See also
Communes of the Meuse department

References

Pierrefittesuraire